An inglenook (Modern Scots ingleneuk), or chimney corner, is a small recess that adjoins a fireplace.

Inglenook may also refer to:

Inglenook, California, community in Mendocino County
Inglenook (winery), vineyards and winery in Rutherford, California
Inglenook Sidings, a railway shunting puzzle
Inglenook Community School, an alternative high school in Toronto, Ontario, Canada
Inglenook, Pennsylvania, an unincorporated community 

Chimney Corner may also refer to:

Chimney Corner, West Virginia in Fayette County, United States
Chimney Corner, Nova Scotia in Inverness County, Canada
Chimney Corner F.C.,  a football (soccer) club in Northern Ireland